The 1983 Milwaukee Brewers season was the first and only where the team entered as a defending conference champion, having lost the World Series to the St. Louis Cardinals the previous year. This season involved the Brewers finishing 5th in the American League East with a record of 87 wins and 75 losses, missing the playoffs for the first time since 1980.

Offseason 
 December 19, 1982: Ernie Camacho was signed as a free agent by the Brewers.
 January 11, 1983: 1983 Major League Baseball draft
Bobby Thigpen was drafted by the Brewers in the 7th round, but did not sign.
Jim Morris was drafted by the Brewers in the 1st round (4th pick) of the  Secondary Phase.

Regular season

Season standings

Record vs. opponents

Notable transactions 
 April 1, 1983: Steve Lake was traded by the Brewers to the Chicago Cubs for a player to be named later and cash. The Cubs completed the trade by sending Rich Buonantony (minors) to the Brewers on October 24.
 June 6, 1983: 1983 Major League Baseball draft
Dan Plesac was drafted by the Brewers in the 1st round (26th pick). Player signed June 8, 1983.
Joey Meyer was drafted by the Brewers in the 5th round.
 June 6, 1983: Gorman Thomas, Ernie Camacho and Jamie Easterly were traded by the Brewers to the Cleveland Indians for Rick Manning and Rick Waits.
 July 15, 1983: Danny Boone was signed as a free agent by the Brewers.
 August 31, 1983: Sixto Lezcano was traded by the San Diego Padres with a player to be named later to the Philadelphia Phillies for players to be named later.

Roster

Player stats

Batting

Starters by position 
Note: Pos = Position; G = Games played; AB = At bats; H = Hits; Avg. = Batting average; HR = Home runs; RBI = Runs batted in

Other batters 
Note: G = Games played; AB = At bats; H = Hits; Avg. = Batting average; HR = Home runs; RBI = Runs batted in

Pitching

Starting pitchers 
Note: G = Games pitched; IP = Innings pitched; W = Wins; L = Losses; ERA = Earned run average; SO = Strikeouts

Other pitchers 
Note: G = Games pitched; IP = Innings pitched; W = Wins; L = Losses; ERA = Earned run average; SO = Strikeouts

Relief pitchers 
Note: G = Games pitched; W = Wins; L = Losses; SV = Saves; ERA = Earned run average; SO = Strikeouts

Awards and honors 
 Cecil Cooper, Roberto Clemente Award

Farm system

The Brewers' farm system consisted of five minor league affiliates in 1983. The Paintsville Brewers won the Appalachian League championship.

Notes

References 
1983 Milwaukee Brewers team at Baseball-Reference
1983 Milwaukee Brewers team page at www.baseball-almanac.com

Milwaukee Brewers seasons
Milwaukee Brewers season
Mil